Lake Timiskaming   or Lake Temiskaming is a large freshwater lake on the provincial boundary between Ontario and Quebec, Canada. There are several islands on the lake, notably Mann and du Collège Islands.

The name is from the Algonquin Temikami or Temikaming, meaning "deep body of water with rapid winds”

There are 30 species of fish in Lake Timiskaming, the best known are northern pike, sturgeon, lake trout, walleye, smallmouth bass, bullhead, carp, burbot, perch, and whitefish.

The lake was shaped during the last ice age when glaciers carved into the rock. It is also the remnants of a huge basin called Lake Ojibway, which existed about 9,500 years ago. Between 1976 and 1981 the DuPagne Classic fishing tourney took place at Wells Rock (David's tobogganing hill).

For the trading post and some history see Fort Témiscamingue.

Timiskaming Graben
Lake Timiskaming is located within an ancient major rift valley that extends several hundred miles to the north-east called the Timiskaming Graben. It is the northern extension of the Ottawa-Bonnechere Graben, which is part of the Saint Lawrence rift system. There have been recent earthquakes along the rift valley, the most recent being in 2000. There are known kimberlite pipes within the rift valley that are considered to be diamondiferous.

See also
Mugwump (folklore)
1935 Timiskaming earthquake
2000 Kipawa earthquake
List of earthquakes in Canada
List of lakes in Ontario

References

External links

Description on Notre-Dame-du-Nord municipal website
Timiskaming - Ontario Highway 11 Homepage

Lakes of Abitibi-Témiscamingue
Lakes of Timiskaming District
Lakes of Nipissing District
Valleys of Ontario
Valleys of Quebec
Borders of Ontario
Borders of Quebec